This is a list of notable events in Latin music (i.e., Spanish- and Portuguese-speaking music from Latin America, Europe, and the United States) that took place in 2003.

Bands formed 
Natalia Lafourcade
Álex Ubago
Maria Rita
Akwid
Ana Cristina
Linda Bandry
Contagious
Daniel René
Nadia López
Roselyn Sánchez
Yahir
Andy & Lucas
Ángel Garay
Big Pepe
Conjunto Pirámide
Iván Díaz
Víctor García
Isabela
Jimena
K-Paz de la Sierra
Punto y Aparte
Sandra
Santos Diablitos
Úrsula Sol
Temblor del Norte
Universales del Norte
Violento
Juan Tavares
Puerto Raíces
Seaxappeal
Son Callejero
Luna Llena
Jorge Correa
La Zurda
Las Niñas
Jae P
 Abraskadabra

Bands reformed

Bands disbanded

Bands on hiatus

Events
September 3 — The 4th Annual Latin Grammy Awards are held at the American Airlines Arena in Miami, Florida.
Juanes is the biggest winner at the award ceremony receiving five awards including Record of the Year and Song of the Year for "Es Por Ti" and Album of the Year for Un Día Normal.
David Bisbal wins Best New Artist.
Brazilian singer Gilberto Gil is honored as the Latin Recording Academy Person of the Year

Number-ones albums and singles by country
List of number-one singles of 2003 (Spain)
List of number-one Billboard Top Latin Albums of 2003
List of number-one Billboard Hot Latin Songs of 2003

Awards
2003 Premio Lo Nuestro
2003 Billboard Latin Music Awards
2003 Latin Grammy Awards
2003 Tejano Music Awards

Albums released

First quarter

January

February

March

Second quarter

April

May

June

Third quarter

July

August

September

Fourth quarter

October

November

December

Unknown

Best-selling records

Best-selling albums
The following is a list of the top 10 best-selling Latin albums in the United States in 2003, according to Billboard.

Best-performing songs
The following is a list of the top 10 best-performing Latin songs in the United States in 2003, according to Billboard.

Deaths
January 17 – , Chilean jazz pianist and composer 
January 24 – Sabotage, Brazilian rapper
January 25 – Jorge "Lobito" Martínez, Paraguayan guitarist and composer of folk music, 50 (murdered) 
February 1 – Mongo Santamaría, Cuban Latin jazz percussionist, 85 
April 9 – , Argentine folk composer
April 13 – , Bolivian performer and composer of boleros
May 15 – , Ecuadorian composer 
June 21 –  Argentine classical, tango, and rock violinist
June 30 – , Argentine rock singer-songwriter
July 1 – Chicho Sánchez Ferlosio, Spanish singer-songwriter, 63
July 5
Bebu Silvetti, Argentine composer and arranger
Fernando Arbex, Spanish rock drummer
July 13 – Compay Segundo, Cuban musician and member of the Buena Vista Social Club
July 16 – Celia Cruz, Cuban salsa singer, 77
August 5 – Tite Curet Alonso, Puerto Rican salsa composer, 77
September 1 – Eulalio "Piporro" González, Mexican actor and singer-songwriter
November 15 – , Argentine folk singer
November 30 – , Spanish rock singer
December 2 - , Peruvian folk singer

References 

 
Latin music by year